Mizoram Pradesh Congress Committee (or Mizoram PCC) is the wing of Indian National Congress serving in Mizoram.

Mizoram Legislative Assembly election

Office Bearers
The Elected Office Bearers of Mizoram Pradesh Congress Committee are:
President: Lalsawta
Vice President: Lal Thanzara
Treasurer: Zodintluanga Ralte

Structure and Composition

History
For about 300 years till 1952, the Mizo people were ruled by the autocratic and hereditary Chiefs. This system was upheld by the British Administration with supervision by the British officers. From the 1920s there had been pent up desire for a political change and for representative form of government. But any signs of Democratic movement were promptly suppressed by the British rulers. For the first time the administration allowed Political organisation in 1946, and the Mizo Union party was immediately formed. The Mizo Union movement soon engulfed the entire land like wild fire. The policy of this party was to away with hereditary and autocratic rule and instead introduce a representative form of government. The aspirations of the people and those of the National Leaders of the INC were similar. When Mr. A.Z. Phizo propagated Independence movement in his visit to Aizawl in 1947 the people here did not take him seriously. The Mizo Union opposed some sporadic attempts of certain groups of people who advocated Mizoram Independence. Members of the Assam Legislature from the Mizo Union joined the Congress Parliamentary Party in the Assam Assembly. There was however, a rift between the Mizo Union and the Assam State Level Congress party from 1959 for various reasons. The Mizo Union finally merged with the Indian National Congress in 1974.

See also
 Indian National Congress
 Congress Working Committee
 All India Congress Committee
 Pradesh Congress Committee

References

External links
 Official Mizoram Pradesh Congress Committee website

External links

Indian National Congress by state or union territory
Political parties in Mizoram
Year of establishment missing